Steve Light (born March 19, 1970) is an author, storyteller, and illustrator of children's books, and he was born in Staten Island NY. He graduated from the Pratt Institute and then studied with David J. Passalcqua. Light started storytelling while teaching at West Side Montessori in Manhattan. At that time, he developed his own storytelling device he calls “storyboxes”.  “Steve Light’s Storyboxes” debuted at the New York Toy Fair in February 2012 by Guidecraft toys. Light published his first book with Abrams Publishing Puss in Boots (2002) and The Shoemaker Extraordinaire (2002).

Upon graduating from the Pratt Institute, Light worked as an illustrator in the corporate world. He created illustrations for companies such as  AT&T, Sony Films, Absolut Vodka, and the New York Times Book Review. Light has also designed buttons that were acquired by the Cooper-Hewitt Design Museum.
He went on to create “Press out and Play” books, a unique building book. Two Hello Kitty and one Uncle Sam books were produced under the “Press out and Play” line.

In 2003, Light made a Touch-and-Feel book of feelings titled I Am Happy published by Candlewick Press.

Light took a break from children’s books to produce his own children’s TV show pilot “Storytime with Steve Light”. When Light returned to publishing he wrote and illustrated Trucks Go with Chronicle Books in 2008 followed by Trains Go in 2012.

Light then returned to Candlewick Press to write and illustrate The Christmas Giant which received a Publishers Weekly starred review. His book Zephyr Takes Flight in October 2012 was also published by Candlewick Press.

Light designed the opening titles for Arian Moayed’s short independent film Overdue.

Light lives in Manhattan with his wife and cat, and when he is not writing or illustrating books, he is teaching at Temple Shaaray Tefilla Nursery school in New York City. Light has told stories from his books and storyboxes in the Milwaukee Art Museum as well as many libraries and schools in the Tri-State Area. Most of his ideas come from his drawings which he enjoys making daily. Light loves to draw mostly with fountain pens; he loves sharing his passion for these vintage drawing tools with children and adults alike.

Works

 Steve Light’s Storyboxes
 Puss in Boots(Harry N. Abrams, 2002) 
 I Am Happy (Candlewick Press, 2003) 
 Press out and Play - Hello Kitty/Uncle Sam https://books.google.com/books?isbn=0810934981
 The Shoemaker Extraordinaire (Harry N. Abrams, 2003) 
 Trucks Go(Chronicle Books, 2008) 
 The Christmas Giant (Candlewick Press, 2010) 
 Trains Go(Chronicle Books, 2012) 
 Zephyr Takes Flight (Candlewick Press, 2012) 
 Have You Seen My Dragon? (Candlewick Press, 2014) 
 Have You Seen My Monster? (Candlewick Press, 2014) 
 Diggers Go (Chronicle Books, 2013) 
 Planes Go (Chronicle Books 2014) 
 Boats Go (Chronicle Books 2015) 
 Cars Go (Chronicle Books 2016) 
 Swap! (Candlewick Press, 2016) 
 The Bunny Burrow Buyer’s Book: A Tale of Rabbit Real Estate (POW!, 2016) 
 Lucky Lazlo (Candlewick Press, 2016) 
 Have You Seen My Lunchbox? (Candlewick Press, 2017)

References

External links
 Steve Light's website
 Steve Light's Candlewick Press Author Page
 Steve Light's Storyboxes
 
 Puss in Boots (2011 film)

1970 births
Living people